A quarter is one-fourth, 25% or 0.25.

Quarter or quarters may refer to:

Places
 Quarter (urban subdivision), a section or area, usually of a town

Placenames
 Quarter, South Lanarkshire, a settlement in Scotland
 Le Quartier, a settlement in France
 The Quarter, Anguilla
 Quartier, Sud, Haiti

Arts, entertainment, and media
 Quarters (children's game) or bloody knuckles, a schoolyard game involving quarters or other coins
 Quarters (game), a drinking game
 Quarters!, a 2015 album by the psychedelic rock group King Gizzard and the Lizard Wizard
 Quarter note, in music one quarter of a whole note
 "Quarters" (Wilco song)
 "Quarter" (song)

Coins
 Quarter (Canadian coin), valued at one-fourth of a Canadian dollar
 Quarter (United States coin), valued at one-fourth of a U.S. dollar
 Washington quarter, the current design of this coin
 Quarter farthing, a British monetary unit
 Quarter dollar,  unit of currencies that are named dollar
 Quarter guinea, a British coin

Military
 General quarters, a naval status requiring all hands to go to battle stations
 Barracks or quarters, buildings built to house military personnel or laborers
 Quarter, a promise or guarantee of mercy to a vanquished enemy; see Safe conduct

Time
 Academic quarter (class timing), term used by universities in various European countries for the 15 minutes between the defined start time for a lecture and the actual time it will start
 Academic quarter (year division), a division of an academic year lasting from 8 to 12 weeks
 Quarter days, in British and Irish tradition, one of four dates in each year on which rents, etc. were due
 Quarter (calendar year), one of four divisions of a calendar year
 One of four divisions (each three months) of a fiscal year

Other uses
 Quarter (unit), various obsolete customary units of measurement
 Quarters of nobility or quarterings, the number of generations in which noble status has been held by a family
 Hanged, drawn and quartered, formerly a punishment for treason in England
 Quarter (heraldry)
 William Quarter (1806–1848)

See also
 
 
 1/4 (disambiguation)
 No quarter (disambiguation)
 The Quarters (disambiguation)
 QTR (disambiguation)
 Quart (disambiguation)
 Quarterdeck (disambiguation)
 Quartering (disambiguation)
 Quartet (disambiguation)
 Quarterly, a magazine published four times a year
 Quartiere, a subdivision of certain Italian towns
 Quartier (unit), an obsolete French unit of measurement
 Quartile, a term from statistics, meaning "fourth"
 Fourth (disambiguation)